Fazli Isfahani Khuzani was an Iranian nobleman from the Khuzani family, who is known for writing the Afzal al-Tawarikh, a chronicle about the history of the Safavid dynasty from its establishment in 1501 by Ismail I (r. 1501–1524) to the death of Abbas I (r. 1588–1629). He was also an official in the Safavid service, functioning as vizier to Qarachaqay Khan, governor of Barda and Kakheti from 1616 to 1625. Fazli's son Najm al-Din Ahmad Khuzani, who is the author of Tiraz al-akhbar, married a daughter of the Mughal nobleman Baqir Khan in India.

Sources 
 
 
 

17th-century Iranian historians
17th-century deaths
1592 births
Safavid historians
Writers from Isfahan
Khuzani family
17th-century writers of Safavid Iran